The Detroit Falcons were a minor professional ice hockey team based in Fraser, Michigan, from 1991 to 1996. For the 1991–92 season, they were known as the Michigan Falcons.  They were a member of the Colonial Hockey League, and served as an affiliate team of the Detroit Red Wings and their farm team, the Adirondack Red Wings. After five seasons in Fraser, the franchise relocated to Port Huron, Michigan, where it was renamed the Port Huron Border Cats.

Season-by-season record

Defunct United Hockey League teams
Ice hockey teams in Detroit
Professional ice hockey teams in Michigan
Ice hockey clubs established in 1991
Sports clubs disestablished in 1996
Ice hockey teams in Michigan
1991 establishments in Michigan
Macomb County, Michigan
1996 disestablishments in Michigan
Florida Panthers minor league affiliates